Ronil Dufrene (born July 4, 1962 in Haiti) is a former Haitian-American soccer player.  He spent at least one season in the United Soccer League, one in the Major Indoor Soccer League and two in the French Ligue 2.  He also earned two caps with the U.S. national team in 1991.

College
Dufrene attended Ulster Community College, earning All American recognition in 1982.  He then transferred to Florida International University in 1983

Professional career
Dufrene signed with the Fort Lauderdale Sun of the United Soccer League.  He joined the Dallas Sidekicks of Major Indoor Soccer League as a free agent on October 3, 1984.  He was injured in an automobile accident on November 17, 1984 which led to his missing several months.  The team released him on April 16, 1985.  In 1986, he joined Stade Reims of Ligue 2.  Over two seasons, he played 42 league games.

National team
Dufrene earned two caps with the U.S. national team in 1991.  The first was a 1-0 loss to Switzerland on February 1, 1991.  Dufrene came on for Jimmy Banks in the 71st minute.  The second was another 1-0 loss, this time to Bermuda on February 21, 1991.  Mark Santel replaced him in the 71st minute.

References

External links
 Dallas Sidekicks profile

1962 births
Living people
American soccer players
FIU Panthers men's soccer players
American sportspeople of Haitian descent
Haitian emigrants to the United States
United States men's international soccer players
United Soccer League (1984–85) players
Fort Lauderdale Sun players
Major Indoor Soccer League (1978–1992) players
Dallas Sidekicks (original MISL) players
American expatriate sportspeople in France
Stade de Reims players
Ligue 2 players
Association football midfielders
Expatriate footballers in France
American expatriate soccer players